Pelophylax nigromaculatus (formerly Rana nigromaculata), is a species of true frog found in East Asia, first described in 1861. This widespread and common frog has many common names, including dark-spotted frog,  black-spotted pond frog, and black-spotted frog.

Occurrence
It occurs across much of eastern and northeastern China, the Amur River valley in Russia, the Korean Peninsula, and most of Japan, although it does not occur on Hokkaidō. It has been considered the commonest of the true frogs on the Korean Peninsula, and has been hunted for food and used as an experimental animal. There are introduced populations in Turkmenistan, Oahu, and Saipan.

Habitat
The dark-spotted frog is a relatively low-altitude species, not being found above 2200 m.  It ranges across a variety of habitats, from deserts and bushland to meadows and forests, and is typically found in or near stagnant or slow-moving water.  Although relatively tolerant of human interference, it is increasingly threatened by hunting and water pollution.

Description
The dorsal colouration varies from grey to greyish-olive, olive, and green. There are usually large dark spots, a light mid-dorsal line, and two lines on dorso-lateral folds. The belly is white. The toes are webbed. Males have a paired vocal sac and nuptial pads on the first finger.

Mating season occurs soon after hibernation. Maturation probably occurs at an age of two years, and the total life span may reach 13 years. The clutch size has been reported as 1800–3000 or 600–5000 eggs. The eggs are laid in shallow water.

Parasites
[[File:Parasite140015-fig3 Protoopalina pingi (Opalinidae) Drawing.tif|thumb|left|100 px|Protoopalina pingi, a parasite of the rectum of Pelophylax nigromaculatus in China]]
Parasites of this frog include the opalinid Protoopalina pingi'' in the rectum.

References

nigromaculatus
Amphibians of China
Amphibians of Japan
Amphibians of Korea
Amphibians of Russia
Amphibians described in 1861
Taxa named by Edward Hallowell (herpetologist)